"Open" is a song recorded by American singer Mya. Following the visual releases of "With You" and "Down", Mya decided to gift her fans with the solo version of "Open" for their support of her thirteenth studio project. "Open" serves as the sixth single taken from T.K.O. (The Knock Out) (2018). A trap-influenced R&B midtempo song, it was written by Mýa and Billy Wes with production handled by frequent collaborator MyGuyMars. 
"Open" was released May 13, 2019.

Background and composition
Initially, Mya met rapper GoldLink through his manager. GoldLink and his team was looking for a singer to record a collaboration for his debut album. Originally, the track was due to feature Amerie, however upon hearing Mýa, GoldLink and his team were sold on the idea of using her vocals. After their collaboration, "Roll Call", which was featured on his album At What Cost (2017). Mýa reached out and reunited with GoldLink on "Open," a song featured on her thirteenth studio project, T.K.O. (The Knock Out) (2018). While the album's version features rapper GoldLink, Mýa decided to gift fans with the solo version for their support of her thirteenth studio project.

Described as "breezy", "Open" is a midtempo "atmospheric trap-flavored R&B" song written by Mýa and Billy Wes with production helmed by frequent collaborator MyGuyMars which  samples an interpolation of the composition "My Life" by Mary J. Blige. "Open" is performed in the key of D♭ major. The song's tempo is set at a moderate beat at 91 beats per minute in common time.

Release
In preparation of the release, Mýa announced on her official Instagram account "Open" was available for preview and pre-order beginning May 6, 2019. The following week, "Open" was officially released May 13, 2019.

Personnel
Credits adapted from Qobuz.

Mýa – vocals, songwriting
Billy Wes – songwriting
Lamar "Mars" Edwards – composer

Release history

References

2018 songs
2019 singles
Mýa songs
Songs written by Mýa